Wes MacAleer (born 12 February 1944) is a Canadian former politician, who was a member of the Legislative Assembly of Prince Edward Island from 1996 to 2007.

Educated at Saint Dunstan's University, MacAleer is a former newspaper publisher. He spent 18 years in the Northwest Territories, where he helped introduce cable television and satellite communications technology.  As a politician, he represented the electoral district of Charlottetown-Spring Park and was a member of the Progressive Conservative Party. MacAleer served in the provincial cabinet as Minister of Economic Development and Tourism.

References 

1944 births
Living people
Members of the Executive Council of Prince Edward Island
People from Summerside, Prince Edward Island
Progressive Conservative Party of Prince Edward Island MLAs
Saint Dunstan's University alumni
21st-century Canadian politicians